North Fork Cimarron River is a  tributary of the Cimarron River that flows from a source in Comanche National Grassland in Baca County, Colorado.  It joins the Cimarron River west of Satanta in Haskell County, Kansas.

See also
List of rivers of Colorado
List of rivers of Kansas

References

Rivers of Colorado
Tributaries of the Arkansas River
Rivers of Baca County, Colorado